Gooseberry most often refers to cultivated plants from two species of the genus Ribes:
 Ribes uva-crispa native to Europe, northwestern Africa and southwestern Asia.
 Ribes hirtellum, American gooseberry
 Hybrids between Ribes hirtellum and Ribes uva-crispa, including most of the modern gooseberry cultivars

The common name is also used for the following botanical groups.

Ribes
Gooseberries may be used to describe the genus Ribes as a whole, or particular wild species of Ribes contrasted with currants, including:

Plants unrelated to Ribes

Gooseberries may also be used to describe tropical plants producing fruit superficially similar to Ribes fruit.  This includes:
 Byrsonima lucida, the "Long Key" gooseberry, native to the Caribbean
 Ceylon gooseberry, a species of Dovyalis, native to Sri Lanka and southern India
 Chinese gooseberry or kiwifruit, the edible berry of a cultivar group of the woody vine Actinidia deliciosa and hybrids between deliciosa and other Actinidia species
 Curio herreanus, a succulent native to South America that superficially resembles gooseberry
 Pereskia aculeata, the Barbados gooseberry, an unusual cactus
 Within family Phyllanthaceae:
 Phyllanthus emblica, the Indian gooseberry or emblic
 Jamaican gooseberry tree, an herb-like plant
 The "Star gooseberry", meaning either:
 Phyllanthus acidus, the "Otaheite gooseberry", the only Phyllanthoideae with edible fruit, or
 Sauropus androgynus, a shrub grown in some tropical regions as a leaf vegetable
 Within family Solanaceae:
 Physalis angulata, also called balloon or cutleaf groundcherry
 Physalis peruviana, Cape gooseberry, indigenous to South America and South Africa
 Withania somnifera, Poison gooseberry

Set index articles on plant common names